Maruse Taro (マルセ太郎, 6 December 1933 in Osaka, Japan - 22 January 2001 in Tokyo) was a Japanese mime artist, comedian, vaudevillian and movie star. His true name was Masanori Kimbara (金原正周) or Kim Kyun-hong (Hanja: 金均洚), however the famous pantomime artist Marcel Marceau was the influence for his vaudevillian name.

Biography
Maruse was born in Osaka, Ikuno (ref), where there is a large Korean population. His father and grandfather are also from the Korean Peninsula. After graduation from high school, he moved to Tokyo and began working as a new wave actor. Maruse gained a reputation amongst audiences for miming apes with advanced techniques.

External links
 

Japanese male stage actors
1933 births
2001 deaths
People from Osaka